Aq Tekeh Khan (also Romanized as Āq Tekeh Khān) is a village in Gorganbuy Rural District, in the Central District of Aqqala County, Golestan Province, Iran. At the 2006 census, its population was 886, in 176 families.

References 

Populated places in Aqqala County